Longest Day is an original novel credited to Michael Collier. Based on the long-running British science fiction television series Doctor Who, it features the Eighth Doctor and Sam.

Synopsis
Hirath is a planet ravaged by overlapping time fields. There are those who seek to exploit this for monetary gain and there's an invading alien race out to just kill.

Continuity
The Doctor and Samantha Jones become separated in this novel, and the next three novels see the Doctor searching for his missing companion. They aren't reunited until the events of Seeing I.

Writing
The book was written by range editor Steve Cole. As BBC Books did not want the editor writing books for the series, Cole asked his friend, Michael Collier, for permission to publish under his name. Cole had Rebecca Levene edit the book.

Cole and Collier repeated the arrangement for The Taint. Collier later became an author of historical fiction in his own right. In a 2022 interview, Cole described the process of writing the book as very rushed and the result as largely "dreadful".

References

External links

1998 British novels
1998 science fiction novels
Eighth Doctor Adventures
Novels by Stephen Cole
BBC Books books